Alicia sansibarensis, commonly known as tuberculate night anemone, is a species of sea anemone in the family Aliciidae. It is found in the Indian and Pacific Oceans. Alicia sansibarensis have tentacles that are very long and snake, which are used for the protection of crownfish from predators.

References

Aliciidae
Animals described in 1900